120th Brigade may refer to:

120th Brigade a 'bantam' infantry formation of the British Army 1915–18
120th (Highland) Brigade an infantry formation of the British Army 1918
120th Infantry Brigade a deception formation of the British Army in Sicily 1943–44
CXX Brigade Royal Artillery a British Army unit 1915–16
120th Guards Mechanised Brigade of the Belarusian Ground Forces
120th Infantry Brigade of the Egyptian Army 1973
120th Field Artillery Brigade of the Egyptian Army
120th Independent Mixed Brigade of the Japanese Army 1945
120th Artillery Brigade of the Russian Ground Forces
120th Anti-Aircraft Brigade of the Ukrainian Air Force
120th Infantry Brigade of the US Army